Kate Bell (born 12 November 1983) is an Australian actress.

Biography
Bell was born in Armidale, New South Wales, Australia. She auditioned for the University of Wollongong and was admitted for a Bachelor of Creative Arts studying Screen Production and Theatre which took 3 years. 
Bell played the role of Bec Sanderson in the television series Blue Water High prior to her graduation, and from this series (where the main theme was surfing) she learned to surf. After playing Bec, she played Joey in Home and Away. She also had a small role in the Power Rangers as well as appearing in the first episode of Stupid, Stupid Man on ABC.

She was in the Australian film In Her Skin, playing the role of Rachel Barber. Her on-screen boyfriend from Blue Water High, Edge (Khan Chittenden), plays Rachel's boyfriend in this film, Manni. Bell played the role of Cassie Hoffman in the online webisodes used to promote the Nine Network telemovie Scorched. As of February 2009, she has a recurring role in Home and Away as Joey Collins. In 2010, Bell had a guest role in Neighbours.

Filmography

Film

Television

Awards and nominations

References

External links

1983 births
Living people
Australian television actresses
People from Armidale
Actresses from New South Wales
21st-century Australian actresses
University of Wollongong alumni